James Haines Farm is a historic home and farm located in Pike Township, Jay County, Indiana. The farmhouse was built in 1884, and is a two-story, Italianate style brick dwelling. It sits on a limestone block foundation, has a low pitched hipped roof, and features a five-sided projecting bay. Also on the property are the contributing summer kitchen, utility shed, large stock barn, long poultry house, privy, small stock barn, and a brooder house.

It was listed on the National Register of Historic Places in 2000.

References

Farms on the National Register of Historic Places in Indiana
Italianate architecture in Indiana
Houses completed in 1884
Buildings and structures in Jay County, Indiana
National Register of Historic Places in Jay County, Indiana